The Packsaddle Bridge is a historic covered bridge in Fairhope Township, Somerset County, Pennsylvania.  It was built in 1877, and is a  Kingpost truss bridge, with full vertical plank siding and large cut stone abutments. The bridge crosses Brush Creek.  It is one of 10 covered bridges in Somerset County.

It was added to the National Register of Historic Places in 1980.

References

Covered bridges in Somerset County, Pennsylvania
Covered bridges on the National Register of Historic Places in Pennsylvania
Bridges completed in 1870
Bridges in Somerset County, Pennsylvania
National Register of Historic Places in Somerset County, Pennsylvania
Road bridges on the National Register of Historic Places in Pennsylvania
Wooden bridges in Pennsylvania
King post truss bridges in the United States
1870 establishments in Pennsylvania